A declaration of war is a formal declaration issued by a national government indicating that a state of war exists between that nation and another. A document by the Federation of American Scientists gives an extensive listing and summary of statutes which are automatically engaged upon the United States declaring war.

For the United States, Article One, Section Eight of the Constitution says "Congress shall have power to ... declare War." However, that passage provides no specific format for what form legislation must have in order to be considered a "declaration of war" nor does the Constitution itself use this term. In the courts, the United States Court of Appeals for the First Circuit, in Doe v. Bush, said: "[T]he text of the October Resolution itself spells out justifications for a war and frames itself as an 'authorization' of such a war." in effect saying an authorization suffices for declaration and what some may view as a formal congressional "Declaration of War" was not required by the Constitution.

The last time the United States formally declared war, using specific terminology, on any nation was in 1942, when war was declared against Axis-allied Hungary, Bulgaria, and Romania, because President Franklin Roosevelt thought it was improper to engage in hostilities against a country without a formal declaration of war.  Since then, every American president has used military force without a declaration of war.

This article will use the term "formal declaration of war" to mean congressional legislation that uses the phrase "declaration of war" in the title. Elsewhere, this article will use the terms "authorized by Congress," "funded by Congress" or "undeclared war" to describe other such conflicts.

History
The United States has formally declared war against foreign nations in five separate wars, each upon prior request by the President of the United States. Four of those five declarations came after hostilities had begun. James Madison reported that in the Federal Convention of 1787, the phrase "make war" was changed to "declare war" in order to leave to the Executive the power to repel sudden attacks but not to commence war without the explicit approval of Congress. Debate continues as to the legal extent of the President's authority in this regard. 

Public opposition to American involvement in foreign wars, particularly during the 1930s, was expressed as support for a Constitutional Amendment that would require a national referendum on a declaration of war. Several Constitutional Amendments, such as the Ludlow Amendment, have been proposed that would require a national referendum on a declaration of war.

After Congress repealed the Gulf of Tonkin Resolution in January 1971 and President Richard Nixon continued to wage war in Vietnam, Congress passed the War Powers Resolution over the veto of Nixon in an attempt to rein in some of the president's claimed powers. The War Powers Resolution proscribes the only power of the president to wage war which is recognized by Congress.

Declarations of war

Formal
The table below lists the five wars in which the United States has formally declared war against ten foreign nations. The only country against which the United States has declared war more than once is Germany, against which the United States has declared war twice (though a case could be made for Hungary as a successor state to Austria-Hungary).

In World War II, the Japanese attacked Pearl Harbor on December 7, 1941. Germany and Italy, led respectively by Adolf Hitler and Benito Mussolini, declared war on the United States, and the U.S. Congress responded in kind.

Undeclared wars

Military engagements authorized by Congress
In other instances, the United States has engaged in extended military combat that was authorized by Congress.

Military engagements authorized by United Nations Security Council Resolutions and funded by Congress
In many instances, the United States has engaged in extended military engagements that were authorized by United Nations Security Council Resolutions and funded by appropriations from Congress.

Other undeclared wars

On at least 125 occasions, the President has acted without prior express military authorization from Congress. These include instances in which the United States fought in the Philippine–American War from 1898–1903, in Nicaragua in 1927, as well as the NATO bombing campaign of Yugoslavia in 1999, and the 2018 missile strikes on Syria.

The United States' longest war, against the Taliban in Afghanistan, began in 2001 and ended with the withdrawal of American troops on 31 August 2021.

The Indian Wars comprise at least 28 conflicts and engagements.  These localized conflicts, with Native Americans, began with European colonists coming to North America, long before the establishment of the United States. For the purpose of this discussion, the Indian Wars are defined as conflicts with the United States of America.  They begin as one front in the American Revolutionary War in 1775 and had concluded by 1918. The United States Army still maintains a campaign streamer for Pine Ridge 1890–1891 despite opposition from certain Native American groups.

The American Civil War was not an international conflict under the laws of war, because the Confederate States of America (CSA) was not a government that had been granted full diplomatic recognition as a sovereign nation by other sovereign states or by the government of the United States.

The War Powers Resolution

In 1973, following the withdrawal of most American troops from the Vietnam War, a debate emerged about the extent of presidential power in deploying troops without a declaration of war. A compromise in the debate was reached with the War Powers Resolution. This act clearly defined how many soldiers could be deployed by the President of the United States and for how long. It also required formal reports by the President to Congress regarding the status of such deployments, and limited the total amount of time that American forces could be deployed without a formal declaration of war.

Although the constitutionality of the act has never been tested, it is usually followed, most notably during the Grenada Conflict, the Panamanian Conflict, the Somalia Conflict, the Persian Gulf War, and the Iraq War.  The only exception was President Clinton's use of U.S. troops in the 78-day NATO air campaign against Yugoslavia during the Kosovo War.  In all other cases, the President asserted the constitutional authority to commit troops without the necessity of congressional approval, but in each case the President received congressional authorization that satisfied the provisions of the War Powers Act.

On March 21, 2011, a number of lawmakers expressed concern that the decision of President Barack Obama to order the U.S. military to join in attacks of Libyan air defenses and government forces exceeded his constitutional authority because the decision to authorize the attack was made without congressional permission. Obama explained his rationale in a two-page letter, stating that as commander in chief, he had constitutional authority to authorize the strikes, which would be limited in scope and duration, and necessary to prevent a humanitarian disaster in Libya.

See also

 Cold War
 Declaration of war by Canada
 Declaration of war by the United Kingdom
 Just War Theory
 Police action
 Timeline of United States military operations
 War on Terror
 War on Drugs

References

Further reading
 
 
 Kenneth A. Schultz, Tying Hands and Washing Hands: The U.S. Congress and Multilateral Humanitarian Intervention, Ch. 4, pp 105–142, in Daniel Drezner, Ed. Locating the Proper Authorities: The Interaction of Domestic and International Institutions, University of Michigan Press, 2003.

External links
 The House of Rep, Republican Study Committee of War and Military Authorized Conflicts. 2003.
 Declarations of war and votes
 Text of Declaration of War on Japan
 Text of Declaration of War on Germany
 Text of Declaration of War on Bulgaria
 Authorization for Use of Military Force — signed September 18, 2001
 House Joint Resolution Authorizing Use of Force Against Iraq — signed October 16, 2002
 Instances of Use of United States Forces Abroad, 1798–1993
 A partial list of U.S. military interventions from 1890 to 2006
 U.S.-Africa Chronology

Wars involving the United States
United States military law
United States defense policymaking
 
Article One of the United States Constitution